Patrick Köppchen (born 21 June 1980) is a German professional ice hockey defenceman who is currently an unrestricted free agent. He most recently played for Düsseldorfer EG in the Deutsche Eishockey Liga (DEL). He previously played with fellow DEL teams Nürnberg Ice Tigers, ERC Ingolstadt, Hamburg Freezers, Hannover Scorpions and Munich Barons.

Playing career 
A Berlin native and product of Eisbären Berlin, Köppchen spent the 1997-98 season in the Manitoba Junior Hockey League, playing for the Neepawa Natives. He made his debut in Germany's elite league DEL for the Munich Barons during the 2000-01 season. The Barons relocated to Hamburg in 2002 and became the Hamburg Freezers. Between 2004 and 2011, Köppchen played for the Hannover Scorpions and helped guide the team to the 2010 German championship. He returned to the Hamburg Freezers in 2011.

On 6 April 2013 Köppchen left the Freezers after two seasons and signed a one-year contract with ERC Ingolstadt. Serving as a team captain, he won the German championship with ERC in 2014 and was named MVP of the playoffs.

He parted ways with ERC Ingolstadt in July 2017 and signed with fellow DEL club Nürnberg Ice Tigers. Köppchen reached the playoff-semis with Nürnberg in the 2017–18 season, before in May 2018, he left and was signed as a free agent to a one-year deal with Düsseldorfer EG.

International play
Köppchen competed at the 2002 IIHF World Championship and the 2015 IIHF World Championship as a member of Germany men's national ice hockey team.

Career statistics

Regular season and playoffs

International

References

External links

1980 births
Living people
Düsseldorfer EG players
Hamburg Freezers players
Hannover Scorpions players
ERC Ingolstadt players
München Barons players
Neepawa Natives players
Ice hockey people from Berlin
Thomas Sabo Ice Tigers players
German ice hockey defencemen